The 7th/10th (City of Belfast) Battalion, Ulster Defence Regiment was formed in 1984 as a result of an amalgamation between the 7th Battalion Ulster Defence Regiment and the 10th Battalion Ulster Defence Regiment.  The resultant 7/10 UDR was subsumed into the Royal Irish Rangers in 1992 as part of the amalgamation which formed the Royal Irish Regiment.

Uniform, armament & equipment
See: Ulster Defence Regiment Uniform, armament & equipment

Greenfinches

Music
In 1990 and 1991 the pipes and drums of 7/10 UDR came second in the European piping championships.

The Stephens Enquiry
In 1989, twenty-eight UDR soldiers were arrested as part of Stevens Inquiry into alleged collusion with loyalist paramilitaries. Twenty-six belonged to the same company of 7/10 UDR. Six were later awarded damages. One was charged with activities linked to loyalist paramilitaries. The Stephens team caused "intense anger" as three hundred police had been used to surround the homes of suspects. This had identified them as UDR soldiers to their neighbours, potentially putting their lives at risk. Eleven moved house as a result and the homes of eighteen others were provided with "additional security measures" at a cost of £25,000.

IRA infiltration?
At the start of June 1987, three attacks were made against soldiers of the same company of the battalion,  including Private John Tracey who was shot dead as he started a new job on apartments off the Lisburn Road, Belfast.  The Belfast Newsletter reported that 7/10 UDR had been infiltrated by the IRA.  The commanding officer accepted that someone must have informed on him but denied that the IRA had been able to penetrate the battalion calling the allegation a "wild rumour".Yet to this day no one has been held accountable for his murder that left his wife and six children without a father or a husband.

Notable personnel
 :Category:Ulster Defence Regiment soldiers
 :Category:Ulster Defence Regiment officers

See also
Ulster Defence Regiment
List of battalions and locations of the Ulster Defence Regiment

Bibliography
 A Testimony to Courage – the Regimental History of the Ulster Defence Regiment 1969 – 1992, John Potter, Pen & Sword Books Ltd, 2001, 
 The Ulster Defence Regiment: An Instrument of Peace?, Chris Ryder 1991 
  Lost Lives, David McKittrick, Mainstream, 2004,

References

Battalions of the Ulster Defence Regiment
Military history of County Antrim
Military history of County Down
1984 establishments in the United Kingdom
1992 disestablishments in the United Kingdom
Military units and formations established in 1984
Military units and formations disestablished in 1992